Laljibhai Patel (born 28 November 1955) is an Indian diamantaire and philanthropic social activist, who is the chairman of Dharmanandan Diamonds Pvt. Ltd. (DDPL) and one of the barons of the Indian diamond Industry.
He has been guiding Dharmanandan Diamonds Group of Companies (Revenue - US$1.5 Billion) for over four and a half decades now and has grown the very company to emerge as one of the largest and globally renowned diamond manufacturers.

Laljibhai Patel ranked in the top 10 wealthiest jewelers in India with a personal fortune of $480 million, a Wealth-X list of India's wealthiest jewelers released on July 1, 2015.

In 2015, he was honored with a lifetime achievement award by Retail Jewellers India for his contribution and success in the industry of luxury goods and his contribution to the betterment of society in Surat and throughout the State of Gujarat. He comes in the top 10 list of richest people in Surat.

Career
After moving to Surat City from his hometown, Ugamedi, in 1974-75 Laljibhai Patel initially began his career as a trader in diamonds and soon gathered thorough knowledge of the industry. Later, in 1985, along with Tulsibhai Goti, his childhood friend, Laljibhai founded a small diamond manufacturing unit named Shreeji Gems. The company grew and in 1993, it was registered as a partnership firm and renamed Dharmanandan Diamonds. Under Laljibhai's leadership, the business continued to grow, and later after 14 years, on August 31, 2007, it was formally incorporated as Dharmanandan Diamonds Pvt. Ltd., which manufactures polished diamonds in all shapes and sizes. In November 2007, the company achieved the prestigious title of De Beers Sightholder, which is one of the largest suppliers of rough diamonds in the world.

Personal life
Laljibhai was born at Ugamedi, a village in Botad district in the state of Gujarat, India, to a farmer family. He moved to Rajkot to complete his secondary school. He studied at Gurukul, Rajkot where he befriended his current business associate, Tulsibhai Goti. Laljibhai married Nirmalaben and the couple has two sons, Hitesh Patel & Piyush Patel, both of whom are now looking after Dharmanandan Diamonds.

Social Work
Laljibhai has also taken the task of addressing various issues of female foeticide, water conservation, education, health, and social illiteracy into his own hands for the betterment of the State of Gujarat.

Save the Girl Child Mega Campaign
Under the presidency of Laljibhai, Samast Patidar Samaj has planned Maha Laddu Beti Bachao Abhiyan. Moreover, with an appeal to stop female foeticide and cultivate the attitude of equality towards girl child, 170,000 six-page informative booklets were distributed throughout the state. On 1 January 2006, Surat glimpsed a massive gathering of 1.2 million people from throughout Gujarat who all took oath in the witness of Ladu Prasadam that we will never do female foeticide and prevent others from doing the same. Limca Book of Records has proudly acknowledged this program.

This vast movement helped improve the gender ratio in Gujarat at 890 girls to 1000 boys in contrast to 761 girls in the year 2006 and has created psychological change, people start believing that girls are in no way less than boys. The discrimination is reduced to the level that people started celebrating the birth of a girl child as they do for the birth of a boy child.

River Linking & Rainwater Conservation
Growing up as a farmer's son, Laljibhai has always been concerned about rainwater conservation. He knew how uncertain rain affects annual crop yield. To resolve this, water conservation at a very large capacity was necessary. The village river Sonal was supposed to fill these ponds, however, during the following weak monsoon, it was seen that these huge ponds could not be filled with river Sonal alone. He diverted water from river Keri that was flowing away to river Sonal by RCC pipeline of  diameter to fill three huge ponds.

In this way, first time in India, he paid tribute to Shri Atal Bihari Vajpayee for his vision of interlinking rivers. This project aims to provide resolution to the perennial problem of water scarcity in the region. The whole cost of the project is borne by Laljibhai on his own.

Clean Ganga Mission
Laljibhai Patel acquired the Narendra Modi Suit for US$693,174 through an auction that was held for a noble cause of raising funds for the cleaning & preservation of the holy river Ganga, a symbol of great Indian heritage. The suit is the world's most expensive clothing and holds the record with Guinness Book of World Records.

Contribution to Kiran Hospital
Being the Vice President of Kiran Hospital, Laljibhai Patel is contributing to the hospital's day-to-day necessity in terms of management. Laljibhai has donated a handsome amount for the construction of the hospital, and as a part of it, a floor is named after Laljibhai's business, Dharmanandan Diamonds. He is also sharing hospital bonds to underprivileged people free of cost to avail treatment at Kiran Hospital.

Schools in Tribal Area
For the overall upliftment of the tribal area, Laljibhai Patel has built 10 schools in the Dang and Narmada district area, each of which has more than 500 tribal children studying.

Promoting Gurukul Education 
Laljibhai himself studied in Gurukul and knows its importance. For that, he is actively involved as a Trustee in Shree Swaminarayan Rajkot Gurukul and Hyderabad Gurukul with 32 and 18 branches respectively, where the best character of 40000 children built up through real education & spiritual enlightenment. Since its inception till 2021, more than 500,000 students are passed from these Gurukul branches together.

Helping Hand for Specially Abled 
Understanding the necessity of the physical ability of humans, Laljibhai, under the Presidency of Shantuben T. Patel Charitable Trust is running a campaign to donate the most important amenities - artificial hands and legs to handicapped people. So far, numerous pieces of artificial hands and legs are donated to needy ones.

Monetary Donation to Hospitals 
Laljibhai Patel has offered monetary support to many hospitals including RMS Multi-speciality Hospital in Dhandhuka, Swami Shree Nirdoshanand Manavseva Hospital in Timbi, Lions Cancer Detection Centre in Surat Civil Hospital, Kiran Hospital in Surat, Shree Swaminarayan Multi-specialty Hospital in Vadtal, and many other health organizations.

References

External links

 

1955 births
Indian billionaires
Businesspeople from Gujarat
People from Surat
Gujarati people
Diamond industry in India
Living people